

Events and publications
 Publishers Comic Media, Fiction House, Star Publications, and Youthful go out of business.

February 
 February 3: A controversial cartoon by Leslie Illingworth in Punch shows a visibly old and tired Winston Churchill behind his desk. It instantly causes outrage and scandal.
 February 13: Leo Baxendale's The Bash Street Kids makes its debut in The Beano, but is still named When the Bell Rings in this period. It will receive its definitive title on 11 November 1956.
 February 27: The first issue of the British comics magazine Jack and Jill is published. It will run until 29 June 1985.
 Hopalong Cassidy, with issue #86, revived by DC Comics, taking over the numbering of the Fawcett Comics series.
 The first issue of the American comics magazine Panic is published.

March 
 March 1: The Billy DeBeck Awards are renamed the Reuben Awards. 
 March 4: Jijé's Jerry Spring makes its debut.
 March 20: Marten Toonder's Koning Hollewijn makes its debut. It will run until 26 June 1971.
 March 20: First issue of the British comics magazine Swift is published. It will run until 2 March 1963. 
 Atlas Comics publishes Lorna, the Jungle Girl #6 (renamed from Lorna, the Jungle Queen)
The secret of Atlantis, by Carl Barks, on Uncle Scrooge.

April 
 April 14: Raymond Macherot's Chlorophylle makes its debut.
 April 19: German-American psychiatrist Fredric Wertham publishes his treatise Seduction of the Innocent. The book warns that comic books are a negative form of popular literature and a serious cause of juvenile delinquency. A minor bestseller, it alarms parents, teachers and moral guardians and galvanized them to campaign for comics censorship.
 April 21–22: United States Senate Subcommittee on Juvenile Delinquency hearings on the comic book industry.
In Italy, Avventure nel West, by Edizioni Audace (Bonelli), series reprinting Italian Western comics, makes its debut.

May
 May 1: The 11th issue of Mad Magazine is published, featuring Basil Wolverton's iconic parody of the Beautiful Girl of the Month on the cover.
May 16: In Italy, the first issues of Albi della rosa (reprints of Disney comics, aimed to the youngest readers) and Albi del falco (adventures of Superman, renamed Nembo Kid, and later also of the other DC heroes) are published by Mondadori. The second magazine, lasted till 1970, makes  superheroes comics popular in Italy, even if the original stories are often heavily manipulated or censored.
In Gilbert, relative genius by Bill Wright, Gilbert, the savant Goofy’s nephew, makes his debut.

June 
 June 1: In Charles M. Schulz' Peanuts Linus Van Pelt is first seen with his security blanket.
 June 4: Further meeting of United States Senate Subcommittee on Juvenile Delinquency
 June 24: In the Johan story Le Lutin du Bois aux Roches, prepublished in Spirou the character Pirlouit (Peewit) makes his debut. The series will eventually change its name to Johan and Peewit.
 Tralla La, a Scrooge McDuck story by Carl Barks, published in Uncle Scrooge #6.
 The first issue of the Belgian children's magazine Bimbo is published. It will run until February 1956.

July
 July 30: In Charles M. Schulz' Peanuts Pig-Pen makes his debut.

August
 August 8: The final episode of Jungle Jim is published.

September
 September 4: The last issue of the Dutch comics magazine Grabbelton is published, a supplement of De Katholieke Illustratie.
 September 11: The first issue of the British comics magazine Tiger is published. It will last until 30 March 1985. 
 September 11: Frank S. Pepper and Joe Colquhoun's Roy of the Rovers makes its debut in Fleetway's Tiger
September 30: The first stories of Daisy Duck’s diary by Dick Moores are published. In the following years, the series will be prosecuted by several American and Italian authors.
 Formation of the Comics Magazine Association of America (CMAA) and the Comics Code Authority (CCA)
 Atlas Comics publishes Crime Fighters Always Win #11 (renamed from Timely's Crimefighters)
 The first issue of the Croatian children's magazine Modra lasta is published.
 Carl Barks publishes his Uncle Scrooge story The Seven Cities of Cibola.

October
 October 3:  Il Grande Blek by Giovanni Sinchetto, Dario Guzzon and Pietro Sartoris, also known as trio EsseGesse, makes its debut.
 October 16: The first issue of the British comics magazine Playhour is published. It will run until 15 August 1987.  
 October 18: Mort Walker and Dik Browne's Hi and Lois makes its debut.
 October: Brad Anderson's Marmaduke makes its debut.
 Matt Murphy and Rex Maxon's Turok makes his debut. In 1956 the character will receive his own comic book series.

November
 November 17: Albert Weinberg's Dan Cooper makes its debut.
 November 25: Mitacq's La Patrouille des Castors makes its debut. 
 The Haunt of Fear, with issue #28 (November/December cover date), canceled by EC Comics.

December
 December 22: Hergé's Tintin story The Calculus Affair is prepublished in Tintin. Halfway the story the obnoxious neighbour Jolyon Wagg makes his debut, as does the running gag of Cutts the Butcher .
 Kodansha publishes Nakayoshi.
 The Vault of Horror, with issue #40 (December 1954/January 1955 cover date), canceled by EC Comics.
 Chamber of Chills, with issue #26, canceled by Harvey Comics.
The Mysterious Stone Ray by Carl Barks, on Uncle Scrooge.

Specific date unknown
 The first episode of Roland Davies' Roddy the Road Scout is published.
 In the Kapitein Rob story De Speurtocht van de Vrijheid by Pieter J. Kuhn Kapitein Rob marries Paula. Due to negative reader reactions he later makes him a lonely drifter again.

Births

April
 April 22: David A. Trampier, American illustrator and comics artist (Wormy), (d. 2014).

June
 June 9: George Pérez, American comic book artist (The Avengers, Crisis on Infinite Earths, Teen Titans) and writer, (d. 2022).
 June 28: Benoît Sokal, Belgian comics artist (Inspector Canardo), (d. 2021).

July
 July 4: Ota, Brazilian comics writer, comics artist, cartoonist and publisher (Os Birutas, worked for the Brazilian edition of Mad Magazine), (d. 2021).

September
 September 19: Garry Leach, British comic book artist (Judge Dredd, Tharg's Future Shocks, Dan Dare), (d. 2022).

November
 November 2: Brian Augustyn, American comic book editor and writer (The Flash, Gotham by Gaslight, Imperial Guard), (d. 2022).

Deaths

January
 January 4: Jimmy McMenamy (aka Jimmy Mack), American comics artist (Dotty Dripple, Good Joe, assisted on Dinky Dinkerton, Secret Agent 6 7/8, continued Big Sister), passes away at age 41.
 January 7: 
 Bruno Angoletta, Italian illustrator and comics artist (Marmittone, Calogero Sorbara, Centerbe Ermete), dies at age 64.
 Albertine Randall, aka Albertine Randall Wheelan, American illustrator and comics artist (The Dumbunnies), passes away at age 90.

February
 February 21: Roland Coe, American comics artist (Crosstown Cartoons, His Nibs), dies at age 46.

July
 July 16: Attilio Mussino, Italian comics artist and illustrator (Bilbolbul, Gian Saetta, Schizzo, Dorotea and Salomone), passes away at age 76.

August
 Specific date unknown: Lou Ferstadt, Ukrainian-American muralist painter, comics artist (Bouncer) and comics studio founder (Ferstadt Studios), dies at age 53.

September
 September 7: Bud Fisher, American comics artist (Mutt and Jeff), dies at age 69.

October
 October 22: George McManus, American comics artist (Bringing Up Father), dies at age 70.

First issues by title

Archie Comics 
 Archie Giant Series

Atlas Comics 
Arrowhead
Battle Ground
Girl's Life
Jungle Action
Jungle Tales
Marines in Battle
Navy Action
Outlaw Fighters
Outlaw Kid
Police Action
The Ringo Kid Western
Riot
Rugged Action
Spy Thrillers
Western Kid (December)
Western Outlaws
Western Thrillers
Wild

Hulton Press 
  Swift

National Comics 
 Superman's Pal Jimmy Olsen (October)
 Our Fighting Forces (October)

Toby Press 
With the Marines on the Battlefronts of the World

Initial appearances by character name

Atlas Comics 
 Gorilla-Man (Ken Hale) in Men's Adventures #26 (March)
 Gorilla-Man (Arthur Nagan) in Mystery Tales #21 (September)
 Jann of the Jungle in Jungle Tales #1 (September)
 M-11 in Menace #11 (May)
 Outlaw Kid in The Outlaw Kid #1 (September)
 Ringo Kid in The Ringo Kid Western #1 (August)
 Western Kid in The Western Kid #1 (November)

Dell Comics 
 Turok in Four Color Comics #596 (October/November)

Harvey Comics 
 Wendy the Good Little Witch in Casper the Friendly Ghost #20 (May)

L. Miller & Son 
 Marvelman in Marvelman #25 (3 February)

National Comics 
Angle Man in Wonder Woman #70 (November), created by Robert Kanigher and Harry G. Peter – DC Comics
Crimesmith in World's Finest Comics #68 (January), 
Halk Kar in Superman #80 (February), created by Otto Binder and Al Plastino – DC Comics
Janu the Jungle Boy in Action Comics #191 (April)
Mirror Man in Detective Comics #213 (November), created by Bill Finger and Sheldon Moldoff – DC Comics
Mysto in Detective Comics #203 (January), created by George Kashdan and Leonard Starr – DC Comics 
Space Cabbie in Mystery in Space #21 (August)

Prize Comics 
 Fighting American in Fighting American #1 (April/May)

Newspaper strips 
 Charlotte Braun in Peanuts (November 30)
 Pig-Pen in Peanuts (July 13)

Italy 

 Tarzanetto, parody of Tarzan, by Roberto Terenchi (Edizioni Dardo)
 Geppo the good-hearted devil (December), created by Giulio Chierchini (Bianconi).

References
 

 
1950s comics